The Concho River is a river in the U.S. state of Texas.  
Concho is Spanish for "shell"; the river was so named due to its abundance of freshwater mussels, such as the Tampico pearly mussel (Cyrtonaias tampicoensis).

Geography

The Concho River has three primary feeds: the North, Middle, and South Concho Rivers. The North Concho River is the longest fork, starting in Howard County and traveling southeast for  until merging with the South and Middle forks near Goodfellow Air Force Base in San Angelo, Texas.

History

Hernando de Ugarte y la Concha, Governor of New Mexico, dispatched an expedition from Santa Fe in 1650 led by Captain Diego del Castillo, to explore what is now north central Texas.  The expedition reached the territory of the Tejas Indians, and reported finding pearls on the Concho River.
The Diego de Guadalajara expedition was launched in 1654 to follow up on Castillo's findings.
The Spanish explored the river for the gem-quality purple to pink pearls produced by that species. 
The mussels were systematically harvested for only a short time because they soon realized that the yield of pearls was too low for their harvest to be economically viable.

See also

List of rivers of Texas
Concho County, Texas
Concho Valley

References

External links 
 
 Southwest Paddler report on Concho River

Rivers of Texas
Rivers of Howard County, Texas
Rivers of Tom Green County, Texas
Rivers of Glasscock County, Texas
Rivers of Sterling County, Texas
Rivers of Coke County, Texas
Rivers of Schleicher County, Texas
Rivers of Concho County, Texas
Tributaries of the Colorado River (Texas)